The Samsung Galaxy F41 is a mid-range Android smartphone manufactured by Samsung Electronics as part of its F series. It is the first phone to be released in the series. The phone has a 6000mAh battery, 64MP main camera, as well as an ultrawide and depth sensor, and a 6.4 in super AMOLED display. It is available in three colours (Fusion Green, Fusion Black and Fusion Blue). It has another version, the Galaxy M21s, released in November 06, 2020 at USA.

Specifications

Hardware 
The Samsung Galaxy F41 shares the same hardware and camera as the international market Galaxy M21.

Software 
The Samsung Galaxy F41 comes with Android 10 with One UI 2.

History 
The Galaxy F41 was announced on October 8, 2020, at Samsung's #FULL ON Launch Event. It was the first phone to be part of Samsung's F series.

References 

Samsung Galaxy
Mobile phones introduced in 2020
Android (operating system) devices
Samsung smartphones
Mobile phones with multiple rear cameras
Mobile phones with 4K video recording